Besik Kharanauli (born 11 November 1939, in Tianeti) is a Georgian poet and writer.

Biography 
Besik Kharanauli Born in 1939, Tianeti, Georgia. In 1962 he graduated Ivane Javakhishvili Tbilisi University, the Department of Philology. After he worked the Literature and Art publishing hose and in the literary magazine Mnatobi.
 
Besik Kharanauli started his literary career in 1954. He is the author of more than twenty poetic collections and two novels. 
 
Poetry by Besik Kharanauli is translated in German, Dutch, Italian, Czech, Hungarian, Russian, Bulgarian. In 2010 his long poem The book of Amba Besarion was published in France. In 2018 Poetry Collection by Besik Kharanauli 'Fünf Dichtungen' was translated and published by German Publishing House Dagyeli Verlag with support of the Georgian National Book Center, translated into German by Nana Chigladze and Norbert Hummelt.
 
In 2011 and 2015 Besik Kharanauli was nominated for the Nobel prize for literature by the Georgian government. In 2015 he won literary prize SABA for the Contribution to the Development of Georgian Literature.

Books
 Translations from American, Intelekti Publishing, 2014,  
 Poems 2003 – 2013, Intelekti Publishing, 2013, 
 The Chief Gamer, Intelekti Publishing, 2012,  
 Poems 1954 – 2005, Intelekti, 2012
 Epigraphs for Forgotten Dreams, Sulakauri, 2005; Palitra L, 2010
 Sixty Knights Riding Mules, Sezane, 2010, 
 100 Poems, Intelekti, 2007,  
 Two Pages about the Sky and Earth, 2005
 Amba Besarion's Book, Arete, 2003, 
 An Afternoon Book, Nakaduli, 1991, 
 Verses, Poems, Merani, 1988
 Dictate, Angelina!, Merani, 1985
 Agonic, Merani, 1991
 The Lame Doll, Merani, 1973

Prizes and awards
 Literary award Saba, 2016
 Literary Prize Litera, 2016
 Honorary award Saba, 2015 for his Contribution to the Georgian Literature 
 Literary Prize GALA, 2012 
 President's Order of Eminence, 2010
 Literary Award Saba, 2004  
 Shota Rustaveli State Prize, 2002 
 The State Prize of Georgia, 1992 for his Contribution to the Georgian Literature

References

External links
 KHARANAULI BESIK
 Death of My Grandmother
 BESIK KHARANAULI
 Besik Kharanauli – Poems
 From THE LAME DOLL by Besik Kharanauli, translated by Timothy Kercher and Ani Kopaliani

Male writers from Georgia (country)
Poets from Georgia (country)
1939 births
Living people
Tbilisi State University alumni
20th-century writers from Georgia (country)
21st-century writers from Georgia (country)
Postmodern writers